Venal is a 1981 Indian Malayalam film, directed by Lenin Rajendran, with story by K. N. Ansari. The film stars Sukumari, Nedumudi Venu, Sukumaran and Jalaja in the lead roles. The film has musical score by MB Sreenivasan.It won the Kerala State Film Award for Best Actress and Filmfare Award for Best Actress – Malayalam for Jalaja

Cast
Jalaja as Remani ( Voice By Latha Raju)
Sukumari
Nedumudi Venu
Sukumaran
Meena Menon
P. K. Abraham

Soundtrack
The music was composed by M. B. Sreenivasan and the lyrics were written by K. Ayyappa Panicker and Kavalam Narayana Panicker.

References

External links
 

1981 films
1980s Malayalam-language films
Films directed by Lenin Rajendran